The 1914 Furman Baptists football team represented Furman University as an independent during the 1914 college football season. Led by first-year head coach W. B. Bible, the brother of Dana X. Bible, the Furman compiled a record of 2–5.

Schedule

References

Furman
Furman Paladins football seasons
Furman Baptists football